The Republic of Cameroon is divided into ten regions.  

In 2008, the President of the Republic of Cameroon, President Paul Biya signed decrees abolishing "provinces" and replacing them with "regions". Hence, all of the country's ten provinces are now known as regions.

Most of these provinces were designated in the 1960s alongside Centre-South Province (split into Centre and South in 1983). At the same time, Adamawa and Far North Provinces were split from North Province. See summary of administrative history in Zeitlyn 2018.

See also
List of regions of Cameroon by Human Development Index
ISO 3166-2:CM
 Communes of Cameroon
 Departments of Cameroon
 Subdivisions of Cameroon
 List of municipalities of Cameroon

References

 

 
Subdivisions of Cameroon
Cameroon, Regions
Cameroon 1
Regions, Cameroon
Cameroon geography-related lists